The Vladimir Nazor Award is a Croatian prize for arts and culture established in 1959 and awarded every year by the Ministry of Culture.

Named after the writer Vladimir Nazor (1876–1949), the prize is awarded to Croatian artists for achievements in six different fields of art and culture, and in each category every year two separate prizes are awarded - one for life achievement (for overall contributions to their respective field), and another one, commonly referred to as the "annual award", for a single piece of outstanding work in the field created over the previous 12 months. 

The winners for the preceding year are usually announced around 19 June, the anniversary of Nazor's death, with prizes handed to recipients in an official ceremony usually held in July.

List of Life Achievement Award winners
Awards marked with † denote shared wins.

Source:

Architecture and urbanism

 1965 – Mladen Kauzlarić
 1966 – Juraj Denzler
 1967 – Stjepan Planić
 1968 – Alfred Albini
 1969 – Josip Seissel
 1970 – Stjepan Gomboš †
 1970 – Lavoslav Horvat †
 1971 – Antun Ulrich
 1972 – Drago Galić
 1973 – Marijan Haberle
 1974 – Vlado Antolić
 1975 – Lovro Perković
 1976 – Slavko Löwy
 1977 – Zvonimir Vrkljan
 1978 – Božidar Rašica
 1979 – Franjo Bahovec
 1980 – Stanko Fabris
 1981 – Božidar Tušek
 1982 – Andre Mohorovičić
 1983 – Zdenko Kolacio
 1984 – Ivan Vitić
 1985 – Neven Šegvić
 1986 – Dragan Boltar
 1987 – Aleksandar Dragomanović
 1988 – Miroslav Begović
 1989 – Zdravko Bregovac
 1990 – Zdenko Sila
 1991 – Boris Magaš
 1992 – Vjenceslav Richter
 1993 – Grozdan Knežević
 1994 – Ivo Radić
 1995 – Zoja Dumenagić
 1996 – Bruno Milić
 1997 – Sena Sekulić-Gvozdanović
 1998 – Ivo Geršić
 1999 – Jerko Marasović †
 1999 – Tomislav Marasović †
 2000 – Silvana Seissel
 2001 – Julije De Luca
 2002 – Ante Marinović-Uzelac
 2003 – Andrija Mutnjaković
 2004 – Slavko Jelinek
 2005 – Mirko Maretić
 2006 – Ante Rožić
 2007 – Ante Vulin
 2008 – Nikola Filipović
 2009 – Boris Krstulović
 2010 – Dinko Kovačić
 2011 – Radovan Miščević
 2012 – Hildegard Auf-Franić
 2013 – Radovan Delalle
 2014 – Ivan Crnković
 2015 – Josip Uhlik
 2016 – Branko Kincl
 2017 – Antun Šatara
 2018 – Branko Silađin
 2019 – Ivan Čižmek
 2020 – Vinko Uhlik
 2021 – Đuro Mirković

Film

 1967 – Oktavijan Miletić
 1970 – Branko Marjanović
 1973 – Fedor Hanžeković
 1974 – Branko Blažina
 1975 – Antun Nalis
 1976 – Rudolf Sremec
 1977 – Branko Majer
 1978 – Obrad Gluščević
 1979 – Branko Belan
 1980 – Branko Bauer
 1981 – Aleksandar Marks
 1982 – Mate Relja
 1983 – Krešo Golik
 1984 – Fadil Hadžić
 1985 – Nikola Tanhofer
 1986 – Vatroslav Mimica
 1987 – Ante Babaja
 1988 – Tomislav Pinter
 1989 – Frano Vodopivec
 1990 – Antun Vrdoljak
 1991 – Fabijan Šovagović
 1992 – Zvonimir Berković
 1993 – Radojka Tanhofer
 1994 – Pavao Štalter
 1995 – Željko Senečić
 1996 – Mia Oremović
 1997 – Tea Brunšmid
 1998 – Boris Dvornik
 1999 – Ante Peterlić
 2000 – Duško Jeričević
 2001 – Ernest Gregl
 2002 – Borivoj Dovniković
 2003 – Ilija Ivezić
 2004 – Vladimir Tadej
 2005 – Zoran Tadić
 2006 – Krsto Papić
 2007 – Arsen Dedić
 2008 – Bogdan Žižić
 2009 – Veljko Bulajić
 2010 – Božidarka Frajt
 2011 – Hrvoje Turković
 2012 – Ivica Rajković
 2013 – Nedeljko Dragić
 2014 – Ivo Štivičić
 2015 – Eduard Galić
 2016 – Božidar Smiljanić
 2017 – Rajko Grlić
 2018 – Rade Šerbedžija
 2019 – Vera Zima
 2020 – Branko Ivanda
 2021 – Petar Krelja

Literature

 1962 – Miroslav Krleža
 1967 – Vjekoslav Kaleb †
 1967 – Dragutin Tadijanović †
 1968 – Dobriša Cesarić †
 1968 – Gustav Krklec †
 1969 – Vjekoslav Majer
 1970 – Nikola Šop
 1971 – Miroslav Feldman
 1972 – Šime Vučetić
 1973 – Novak Simić
 1974 – Marijan Matković
 1975 – Ranko Marinković
 1976 – Vladimir Popović
 1977 – Drago Ivanišević
 1978 – Joža Horvat
 1979 – Marin Franičević
 1980 – Josip Barković
 1982 – Vesna Parun
 1983 – Jure Franičević-Pločar
 1984 – Aleksandar Flaker †
 1984 – Jure Kaštelan †
 1985 – Mirko Božić
 1986 – Vojin Jelić
 1987 – Živko Jeličić
 1988 – Ivan Slamnig
 1989 – Slobodan Novak
 1990 – Olinko Delorko
 1991 – Petar Šegedin
 1992 – Ivo Frangeš
 1993 – Srećko Diana
 1994 – Nikola Miličević
 1995 – Rajmund Kupareo
 1996 – Slavko Mihalić
 1997 – Ivan Kušan
 1998 – Miroslav Slavko Mađer
 1999 – Vesna Krmpotić
 2000 – Stanko Lasić
 2001 – Ivo Brešan
 2002 – Gajo Peleš
 2003 – Viktor Žmegač
 2004 – Josip Tabak
 2005 – Irena Vrkljan
 2006 – Miroslav Šicel
 2007 – Nedjeljko Fabrio
 2008 – Zvonimir Mrkonjić
 2009 – Milivoj Solar
 2010 – Ivan Aralica
 2011 – Nikica Petrak
 2012 – Luko Paljetak
 2013 – Tonko Maroević
 2014 – Zvonimir Majdak
 2015 – Pavao Pavličić
 2016 – Dubravko Jelčić
 2017 – Feđa Šehović
 2018 – 
 2019 – Andriana Škunca
 2020 – Dubravka Oraić-Tolić
 2021 – Hrvoje Hitrec

Music

 1960 – Svetislav Stančić
 1963 – Josip Križaj
 1964 – Jakov Gotovac
 1965 – Antonija Geiger-Eichhorn †
 1965 – Ančica Mitrović †
 1968 – Boris Papandopulo
 1969 – Vilma Nožinić
 1970 – Ivo Tijardović
 1971 – Nada Tomčić
 1972 – Marijana Radev
 1973 – Stjepan Šulek
 1974 – Ivan Brkanović
 1975 – Bruno Bjelinski
 1976 – Milo Cipra
 1977 – Ivo Maček
 1978 – Branimir Sakač
 1979 – Slavko Zlatić
 1980 – Dora Gušić
 1981 – Rudolf Matz
 1982 – Natko Devčić
 1983 – Milko Kelemen
 1984 – Jeronim Noni Žunec
 1985 – Emil Cossetto
 1986 – Milan Horvat
 1987 – Rudolf Klepač
 1988 – Miljenko Prohaska
 1989 – Dragutin Bernardić
 1990 – Tomislav Neralić
 1991 – Adalbert Marković
 1992 – Nada Puttar-Gold
 1993 – Jurica Murai
 1994 – Stjepan Radić
 1995 – Anđelko Klobučar
 1996 – Ruža Pospiš-Baldani
 1997 – Mladen Bašić
 1998 – Igor Gjadrov
 1999 – Ljiljana Molnar-Talajić
 2000 – Josip Klima
 2001 – Stanko Horvat
 2002 – Božena Ruk-Fočić
 2003 – Tonko Ninić
 2004 – Pavle Dešpalj
 2005 – Vladimir Krpan
 2006 – Branka Stilinović
 2007 – Damir Novak
 2008 – Zagreb Quartet
 2009 – Nikša Bareza
 2010 – Ruben Radica
 2011 – Mirka Klarić
 2012 – 
 2013 – Pavica Gvozdić
 2014 – Prerad Detiček
 2015 – Alfi Kabiljo
 2016 – Vladimir Kranjčević
 2017 – Dubravko Detoni
 2018 – Dunja Vejzović
 2019 – Valter Dešpalj
 2020 – Sretna Meštrović
 2021 – Višnja Mažuran

Theatre

 1964 – Mila Dimitrijević
 1966 – Zvonimir Rogoz
 1968 – Tomislav Tanhofer
 1969 – Viktor Bek †
 1969 – Božena Kraljeva †
 1969 – Vika Podgorska †
 1970 – Slavko Batušić †
 1970 – Veljko Maričić †
 1971 – Mato Grković
 1972 – Bela Krleža
 1973 – Anđelko Štimac
 1974 – Emil Kutijaro
 1975 – Ervina Dragman
 1976 – Ivo Hergešić
 1977 – Vlado Habunek
 1978 – Ana Roje †
 1978 – Oskar Harmoš †
 1979 – Mira Župan
 1980 – Mirko Perković
 1981 – Zvonko Agbaba
 1982 – Ana Maletić
 1983 – Josip Marotti
 1984 – Mladen Šerment
 1985 – Kosta Spaić
 1986 – Pero Kvrgić
 1987 – Vesna Butorac-Blaće
 1988 – Mladen Škiljan
 1989 – Drago Krča
 1990 – Miše Martinović
 1991 – Sonja Kastl
 1992 – Tonko Lonza
 1993 – Milka Podrug-Kokotović
 1994 – Božidar Violić
 1995 – Tomislav Durbešić
 1996 – Aleksandar Augustinčić
 1997 – Nada Subotić
 1998 – Zvjezdana Ladika
 1999 – Relja Bašić
 2000 – Joško Juvančić
 2001 – Neva Rošić
 2002 – Milko Šparemblek
 2003 – Ika Škomrlj
 2004 – Nikola Batušić
 2005 – Vanja Drach
 2006 – Vanča Kljaković
 2007 – Georgij Paro
 2008 – Zlatko Crnković
 2009 – Vladimir Gerić
 2010 – Zlatko Vitez
 2011 – Špiro Guberina
 2012 – Nenad Šegvić
 2013 – Božidar Boban
 2014 – Marija Kohn
 2015 – Ivica Boban
 2016 – Mustafa Nadarević
 2017 – Dragan Despot
 2018 – Marija Sekelez
 2019 – Helena Buljan
 2020 – Branka Cvitković
 2021 – Ivica Kunčević

Visual and applied arts

 1961 – Frano Kršinić
 1963 – Marino Tartaglia
 1964 – Ljubo Babić †
 1964 – Oton Postružnik †
 1965 – Oskar Herman
 1966 – Mirko Rački †
 1966 – Vilko Gecan †
 1968 – Jerolim Miše
 1969 – Antun Motika †
 1969 – Zlatko Šulentić †
 1970 – Marijan Detoni †
 1970 – Krsto Hegedušić †
 1971 – Antun Mezdjić
 1972 – Frano Šimunović
 1973 – Vilko Šeferov
 1974 – Stella Skopal
 1975 – Vjekoslav Parać
 1976 – Oton Gliha
 1977 – Vilim Svečnjak
 1978 – Ante Roca †
 1978 – Slavko Šohaj †
 1979 – Vojin Bakić
 1980 – Zlatko Prica †
 1980 – Milan Vulpe †
 1981 – Edo Kovačević
 1982 – Mira Kovačević-Ovčačik †
 1982 – Željko Hegedušić †
 1983 – Ljubo Ivančić †
 1983 – Oto Reisinger †
 1984 – Ksenija Kantoci
 1985 – Branko Ružić †
 1986 – Kosta Angeli Radovani
 1987 – Ivan Šebalj
 1988 – Želimir Janeš
 1989 – Šime Perić
 1990 – Ferdinand Kulmer
 1991 – Ivan Lovrenčić
 1992 – Dalibor Parać
 1993 – Mladen Veža
 1994 – Ivan Picelj
 1995 – Milena Lah
 1996 – Đuro Pulitika
 1997 – Ivan Kožarić
 1998 – Nikola Reiser
 1999 – Aleksandar Srnec
 2000 – Edo Murtić
 2001 – Đuro Seder
 2002 – Julije Knifer
 2003 – Nives Kavurić-Kurtović
 2004 – Zlatko Bourek
 2005 – Vjekoslav Vojo Radoičić
 2006 – Josip Vaništa
 2007 – Dušan Džamonja
 2008 – Nikola Koydl
 2009 – Alfred Pal
 2010 – Šime Vulas
 2011 – Ivan Ladislav Galeta
 2012 – Marija Ujević-Galetović
 2013 – Mladen Stilinović
 2014 – Jagoda Buić
 2015 – Zlatko Keser
 2016 – Eugen Feller
 2017 – Biserka Baretić
 2018 – Nevenka Arbanas
 2019 – Mihajlo Arsovski
 2020 – Juraj Dobrović
 2021 – Slavka Pavić

Notes

nb 1.  Classical music composer Ivo Malec turned down the prize in 2012. Following Malec's refusal, the ministry decided not to choose another recipient. In 2018, writer Danijel Dragojević also refused to accept the prize.

References

External links
Vladimir Nazor Award at the Ministry of Culture website 

Arts awards in Croatia
Awards established in 1959
1959 establishments in Croatia
Croatian film awards
Architecture in Croatia
Croatian literature
Croatian music